John Hampton was Governor of Western Australia.

John Hampton may also refer to:

John de Hampton, MP for Hampshire 1362
John Hampton (MP), MP for Hampshire 1394
John Hampton (abbot) Abbot of Shrewsbury, 1426-1433
John Hampton (died 1472), MP for Staffordshire 1437, 1439, 1442, 1445, 1449 and 1453
John Hampton (philanthropist)
John Hampton (music producer)
John Hampton (footballer), English footballer
John G. Hampton, director of MacKenzie Art Gallery
John P. Hampton (died 1827), first Chief Justice of the Supreme Court of Mississippi